Isthmus is the sixth studio album by Irish ambient musician Seamus Ó Muíneacháin.

Background and release
Isthmus was recorded after O'Muineachain returned to Ireland from the Czech Republic, and was inspired by the landscape of the Erris region. The album features field recordings and collaborations with cellist Akito Goto. The album had its radio premiere on The Stephen McCauley Show on BBC Radio Ulster on 30 August 2022. The lead single "Lost Fishermen" was broadcast on KEXP, An Taobh Tuathail, KXCI, BBC 6 Music, and
Açık Radyo. The album premiered on It's Psychedelic Baby! Magazine on September 27th.

Reception

Mike Mineo of Obscure Sound wrote: "There’s an immediate charm to the album’s scenic and lush composure." Nialler9 wrote that the album was “delicately poised and reflective in nature.” Raffael Russo reviewed the album positively in the Italian music magazine Rockerilla. In their New and Notable section, the website Bandcamp wrote: "Seamus O’Muineachain takes us to his hometown of Belmullet, Ireland through patient, pensive ambient composition." Writing for Spectrum Culture, Pat Padua said "The EP takes less than 27 minutes to tell its story, but that brief time is used to communicate the patient appreciation of a dreamlike existence on the other side of the world." It was included on Star's End list of significant releases of 2022.

Track listing

Personnel

Seamus O'Muineachain – piano, guitar, keyboard, synth, percussion, dulcimer, field recordings, production
Akito Goto – cello

References

External links
 Isthmus on Bandcamp

Jimmy Monaghan albums
2022 albums